Zwackhiomyces sipmanii is a species of lichenicolous fungus in the family Xanthopyreniaceae. Found in the boreal ecosystem of north-eastern Russia, it was formally described as a new species in 2009 by Paul Diederich and Mikhail Zhurbenko. It is only known from the type locality. The species epithet honours Dutch lichenologist Harrie Sipman, "on the occasion of his 64th birthday".

References

Xanthopyreniaceae
Fungi described in 2009
Fungi of Europe
Lichenicolous fungi
Taxa named by Mikhail Petrovich Zhurbenko